Dražen Luburić (born 2 November 1993) is a Serbian professional volleyball player, a member of the Serbia national team. The 2019 European Champion and the 2016 World League winner. At the professional club level, he plays for Lokomotiv Novosibirsk.

Career
On 17 July 2016, Serbia, including Luburić, achieved a gold medal at the 2016 World League. It was the first ever World League gold medal for the Serbian national team, and the first international success for Luburić.

Honours

Clubs
 CEV Challenge Cup
  2014/2015 – with Vojvodina Novi Sad

 National championships
 2014/2015  Serbian Cup, with Vojvodina Novi Sad
 2018/2019  Turkish SuperCup, with Halkbank Ankara

References

External links

 
 Player profile at LegaVolley.it 
 Player profile at PlusLiga.pl 
 Player profile at Volleybox.net

1993 births
Living people
Sportspeople from Novi Sad
Serbian men's volleyball players
European champions for Serbia
European Games competitors for Serbia
Volleyball players at the 2015 European Games
Serbian expatriate sportspeople in Italy
Expatriate volleyball players in Italy
Serbian expatriate sportspeople in Japan
Expatriate volleyball players in Japan
Serbian expatriate sportspeople in Russia
Expatriate volleyball players in Russia
Serbian expatriate sportspeople in Turkey
Expatriate volleyball players in Turkey
Skra Bełchatów players
VC Zenit Saint Petersburg players
VC Belogorie players
Opposite hitters